"Battleground" is a fantasy short story by American writer Stephen King, first published in the September 1972 issue of Cavalier magazine, and later collected in King's 1978 collection Night Shift.

Plot summary
Renshaw is a professional hit-man, who returns from his assassination of a toy-maker to find a package delivered to his penthouse apartment. The package contains a G.I. Joe Vietnam Footlocker, sent to him by the mother of the toy-maker he had recently killed. When he opens the package, he finds that the toy soldiers are alive with working copies (albeit miniature) of weapons, jeeps, and helicopters. To Renshaw's surprise, the tiny soldiers begin to attack him. Despite his training and experience as a hitman, Renshaw finds himself outnumbered and outgunned, and he cedes control of the living room to the toy soldiers, taking cover in the bathroom. The soldiers pass a piece of paper under the door, demanding his surrender, but Renshaw writes "NUTS!" on the paper and sends it back, prompting a barrage of rocket fire which destroys most of the door.

Renshaw eventually plots to destroy the soldiers with a Molotov cocktail constructed from a bottle of lighter fluid, but before the cocktail detonates, a massive blast destroys the entire apartment. Outside in a park below, a couple finds Renshaw's bloody T-shirt, and the other contents of the footlocker are revealed, including one made-to-scale thermonuclear weapon.

Film and TV adaptations

"Battleground" was converted to a teleplay by Richard Christian Matheson for the television series Nightmares & Dreamscapes. Originally airing on Wednesday July 12, 2006, the episode was directed by Brian Henson and starred William Hurt as Renshaw the assassin. There is no dialogue in the entire episode.

The episode featured a longer ending than the short story, in which Renshaw is attacked again and makes it out of the penthouse for a final showdown in the elevator shaft with an angry plastic commando (played by an uncredited Bill Barretta).  Renshaw defeats the final commando, only to find it has armed a thermonuclear weapon that then explodes and kills him.

At several points during the televised episode, the killer Zuni fetish doll from the "Amelia" segment of the 1975 television movie Trilogy of Terror can be spotted as part of Renshaw's trophy collection. This is an homage to Richard Matheson, the father of Richard Christian Matheson and the author of Trilogy of Terror. The episode also has a similar plot and structure to Richard Matheson's classic 1961 episode of The Twilight Zone, "The Invaders" which presents a similar sort of battle between a silent protagonist and miniature attackers.

In the short story, Renshaw's written response to the tiny plastic soldiers' demand for surrender is "NUTS", the response given by General Anthony McAuliffe to the Germans during the Battle of the Bulge. His written response was changed to "SCREW YOU!" in the televised episode.

Several film shots and action scenes remind of famous war/action movies. So William Hurt has his head in the pool at waterline like Martin Sheen in Apocalypse Now at the end. The last surviving toy soldier has an "army of one" look and attitude like Rambo and the elevator scenes bear strong similarities with the Die Hard movie fight scenes.

The story was also made into an animated short film, Srazhenie ( - meaning "Battle"; see External Links below) by the Soviet Kievnauchfilm studio in 1986, directed by Mikhail Titov.

The concept of a person being attacked and killed by group of living green plastic soldiers was also featured in the Darkroom anthology horror/thriller series' 1981 episode "Siege of 31 August".

A similar concept made it to the screen in the films Tales from the Hood (1995) and Small Soldiers (1998), as well as the song Little Guns (1983) by Oingo Boingo.

See also
 Stephen King short fiction bibliography

References

External links 

 (Nightmares & Dreamscapes episode)
 Soviet cartoon adaptation 

Short stories by Stephen King
1972 short stories
Fantasy short stories
Horror short stories
Sentient toys in fiction
Works originally published in Cavalier (magazine)
Short stories adapted into films